Li Meng (born 2 January 1995) is a Chinese basketball player for Shenyang Army Golden Lions and the Chinese national team, where she participated at the 2014 FIBA World Championship.

References

External links

1995 births
Living people
Chinese women's basketball players
Shooting guards
Basketball players from Shenyang
Shenyang Army Golden Lions players
Asian Games medalists in basketball
Basketball players at the 2018 Asian Games
Asian Games gold medalists for China
Medalists at the 2018 Asian Games
Basketball players at the 2020 Summer Olympics
Olympic basketball players of China